The Miracle Mile is an Australian harness racing event for Standardbred pacers that was held at Harold Park Racetrack each November until 2008 when the race was switched to Menangle Park Paceway. Prize money has long been among that of Australia's leading harness races and has often included bonuses for speed.

History
The race was held twice in 1986 due to a change of dates from January to November/December, and again in 1996 due to the postponement of the 1995 race caused by track redesign and construction. When the new track opened in 1996 the race distance was changed from one mile (1609m) to 1760m. The 2007 running was abandoned due to the Equine Influenza outbreak. The 2012 race was also delayed until April 2013 due to renovations.

Since 2009, the race has been run at Menangle Park, once again at the metric mile distance. The 1400m track length and improved design allowed for faster times. The first winner at the new circuit was New Zealander Monkey King in a track record time of 1:50.8. In 2010 Victorian pacer Smoken Up, who ran 2nd the previous year, won the race and broke the Australasian record in at time of 1:50.3 (Smoken Up has subsequently lowered that record to 1:48.5 in the Len Smith Mile, also at Menangle).

The fastest ‘miles’ at Harold Park were 1:55.6 by Westburn Grant in 1990, 1:56.1 by Master Mood and 1:56.2 by Chokin. When the race distance became 1760 metres the fastest mile rates were 1:54.2 by Iraklis and 1:54.4 by Christian Cullen.

The Miracle Mile proved elusive to legendary reinsman Brian Hancock who trained one winner in Our Sir Vancelot but due to suspension was unable to drive the three-times Inter Dominion champion on the night of his win in 1997. As set out below there have been several dual winners of the flying mile - notably Smoken Up, Be Good Johnny, Sokyola, Holmes DG, Chokin, Westburn Grant and Village Kid. Champion drivers Lance Justice, Vic Frost and Tony Herlihy have won the race three times each. Kellie Kersley became the first female driver to win the race in 1996. The oldest horse to win the race was 12-year-old Double Agent.

The running of the 2022 Miracle Mile was forced to be delayed for a week from the 5th March to the 12th March after the track suffered damage due to a heavy downpour of rain between the Ainsworth Free For All (Group 1) and the Miracle Mile.

Winners list

See also

 A G Hunter Cup
 Australian Pacing Championship
 Inter Dominion Pacing Championship
 New Zealand Trotting Cup
 Queensland Pacing Championship
 Victoria Cup
 Harness racing in Australia
 Harness racing in New Zealand

External links
 Miracle Mile homepage

Harness races in Australia
Australasian Grand Circuit Races